Cryptoblabes bistriga is a species of snout moth in the genus Cryptoblabes. It was described by Adrian Hardy Haworth in 1811. It is found in most of Europe, except Portugal, parts of the Balkan Peninsula and Ukraine.

The wingspan is 18–20 mm. Adults have a distinctive broad reddish area in the middle of the forewing. They are on wing from late June to July.

The larvae feed on the leaves of various trees, including Quercus, Alnus and Myrica species. They feed from within a folded leaf.

References

Moths described in 1811
Cryptoblabini
Moths of Japan
Moths of Europe